Helicobacter acinonychis is a bacterium in the Helicobacteraceae family, Campylobacterales order. It was first isolated from cheetahs (Acinonyx jubatus) with gastritis, so has been associated with this disease in this particular species and others of its kind. It is Gram-negative, spiral-shaped, and grows under microaerophilic conditions. The type strain is 90-119 (CCUG 29263, ATCC 51101).

References

Further reading

External links

LPSN
Type strain of Helicobacter acinonychis at BacDive -  the Bacterial Diversity Metadatabase

Campylobacterota
Bacteria described in 1993